The 2019–20 McNeese State Cowboys basketball team represented McNeese State University in the 2019–20 NCAA Division I men's basketball season. The Cowboys, led by second-year head coach Heath Schroyer, played their home games at the Health and Human Performance Education Complex in Lake Charles, Louisiana as members of the Southland Conference. They finished the season 15–17, 10–10 in Southland play to finish in a three-way tie for sixth place. They lost in the first round of the Southland tournament to Lamar.

Previous season
The Cowboys finished the 2018–19 season 9–22 overall, 5–13 in Southland play to finish in 12th place. Since only the top eight teams are eligible for the Southland tournament, they failed to qualify.

Roster

Schedule and results

|-
!colspan=12 style=| Non-conference regular season

|-
!colspan=9 style=| Southland regular season

|-
!colspan=12 style=| Southland tournament
|-

|-

Source

See also 
2019–20 McNeese State Cowgirls basketball team

References

McNeese Cowboys basketball seasons
McNeese State Cowboys
McNeese State Cowboys basketball
McNeese State Cowboys basketball